The canton of Mortagne-au-Perche is an administrative division of the Orne department, northwestern France. Its borders were modified at the French canton reorganisation which came into effect in March 2015. Its seat is in Mortagne-au-Perche.

It consists of the following communes:
 
Bazoches-sur-Hoëne
Bellavilliers
Boëcé
Champeaux-sur-Sarthe
La Chapelle-Montligeon
Comblot
Corbon
Coulimer
Courgeon
Courgeoût
Feings
Loisail
Mauves-sur-Huisne
La Mesnière
Montgaudry
Mortagne-au-Perche
Parfondeval
Pervenchères
Le Pin-la-Garenne
Réveillon
Saint-Aquilin-de-Corbion
Saint-Aubin-de-Courteraie
Saint-Denis-sur-Huisne
Sainte-Céronne-lès-Mortagne
Saint-Germain-de-Martigny
Saint-Hilaire-le-Châtel
Saint-Jouin-de-Blavou
Saint-Langis-lès-Mortagne
Saint-Mard-de-Réno
Saint-Martin-des-Pézerits
Saint-Ouen-de-Sécherouvre
Soligny-la-Trappe
Villiers-sous-Mortagne

References

Cantons of Orne